Hellen Kimaiyo Kipkoskei (born September 8, 1968 in Moiben) is a retired runner from Kenya.

She won many continental competitions. She competed at the 1984 Summer Olympics aged less than 16  and at the 1992 Summer Olympics. She is also a multiple Kenyan champion.

In addition, she was a successful road runner. She won the Peachtree Road Race three times a row (1996–1998)  and Dam tot Damloop four times a row (1992–1995). Kimaiyo won Zevenheuvelenloop in 1995. She won in 1994.

She held the African records for 1500 and 3000 metres.
 
Kimaiyo went to the Singore Girls Secondary School in Iten. She is married to Charles Kipkorir, who is also a former Kenyan runner. Soon after the 1984 Olympics she became pregnant and gave birth to her first child. She had a second child following her 1990 pregnancy.

International competitions

See also
List of African Games medalists in athletics (women)
List of African Championships in Athletics medalists (women)

References

External links

1968 births
Living people
Kenyan female middle-distance runners
Kenyan female long-distance runners
Kenyan female cross country runners
Olympic athletes of Kenya
Athletes (track and field) at the 1984 Summer Olympics
Athletes (track and field) at the 1992 Summer Olympics
African Games silver medalists for Kenya
African Games medalists in athletics (track and field)
Athletes (track and field) at the 1987 All-Africa Games
African Championships in Athletics winners
African Cross Country Championships winners